The men's 400 metre freestyle event at the 2014 Commonwealth Games as part of the swimming programme took place on 24 July at the Tollcross International Swimming Centre in Glasgow, Scotland.

The medals were presented by Games ambassador David Carry and the quaichs were presented by Muhammad Khalid Mahmood, Secretary General of the Pakistan Olympic Association.

Records
Prior to this competition, the existing world and Commonwealth Games records were as follows.

Results

Heats

Final

References

External links

Men's 0400 metre freestyle
Commonwealth Games